All In may refer to:

Books
 All In (Levs book), a 2015 book by Josh Levs
 All In: An E-Guide to No Limit Texas Hold'em, a book by Amarillo Slim and Brent Riley
 All In: The Education of General David Petraeus, a 2012 biography of General David Petraeus written by Paula Broadwell

Film and television

Films
 All In (film), a 1936 British sports comedy
 All In: The Fight for Democracy, a 2020 American documentary

Television episodes
 "All In" (Amphibia)
 "All In" (CSI)
 "All In" (CSI: Miami)
 "All In" (Homeland)
 "All In" (House)
 "All In" (Law & Order: Criminal Intent)
 "All In" (Major Crimes)
 "All In" (Ozark)
 "All In" (Person of Interest)
 "All In" (The Shield)
 "All In" (Suits)
 "All In" (White Collar)

Television series
 All In (TV series), a 2003 South Korean drama
 All In with Laila Ali, an educational program on CBS Dream Team
 All In with Chris Hayes, a news and opinion television program

Music

Albums
 All-In, by Arling & Cameron, 1999
 All In (Stroke 9 album), 2004
 All In (Stellar Kart album), 2013
 All In, by Matthew West, 2017
 All In, by Down by Law, 2018
 All In (Stray Kids EP), 2020
 All In, by Skepta, 2021
 All In (Stan Walker album), 2022

Live
All In (concert residency), a 2017–2018 Las Vegas show by Ricky Martin

Songs
 "All In", by Kid Cudi from Passion, Pain & Demon Slayin', 2016
 "All-In", by Sonic Boom Six from The Ruff Guide to Genre-Terrorism, 2006
 "All In", by Monsta X from The Clan Pt. 1 Lost, 2016
 "All In", by Stray Kids form the EP of the same name, 2020
 "All In" (Lifehouse song), 2010
 "All In" (Lil Baby song), 2020
 "All In" (YoungBoy Never Broke Again song), 2020

Professional wrestling
 All In (professional wrestling event), a 2018 professional wrestling event
 All-in professional wrestling, a 20th-century British style of professional wrestling

Sports
A motto used by the Clemson Tigers
A motto used by the Cleveland Cavaliers during their 2016 championship playoff run

Other
 All in (poker), wagering one's entire stake

See also
 All or Nothing (disambiguation)
 Allin